Jitka Harazimova (née Cervenkova) (May 23, 1975) is a Czech professional bodybuilder.

Early life and education
Jitka Harazimova (born Cervenkova) was born 1975 in Prague, Czech Republic. In school, she played volleyball, and took gymnastics.

Bodybuilding career

Amateur career
In 1993, Jitka attended her first bodybuilding competition, the Jr. Czech, which she won.

Professional career
In 1997, she attended her first pro show at the 1997 Ms. International where she placed 4th. Between 1999 and 2005, she took a break from competing and had two children during that time. Prior to break from competing, she was considered a future flag bearer for women's bodybuilding and a potential Ms. Olympia. In 2005, she returned to bodybuilding and won the 2005 Charlotte Pro heavyweight class. At the 2005 Ms. Olympia, she placed 4th, the best in her performance.

Competition history
 1993 Jr. Czech - 1st
 1993 Czech Nationals - 1st (MW and overall)
 1994 Czech Nationals - 2nd (MW)
 1997 IFBB Ms. International - 4th
 1997 IFBB Ms. Olympia - 6th
 1998 IFBB Ms. International - 5th
 1998 IFBB Ms. Olympia - 7th
 1999 IFBB Ms. International - 10th
 2005 IFBB Charlotte Pro Championships - 1st (HW and overall)
 2005 IFBB Ms. Olympia - 4th
 2006 IFBB Ms. International - 4th
 2006 IFBB Ms. Olympia - 10th

Personal life
Jitka currently lives in Prague, Czech Republic. She currently owns Gym Hara where she is a personal trainer. She is the youngest of six children (three boys / three girls). She currently has four kids (two boys / two girls).

References

External links
Facebook homepage 

1975 births
Czech female bodybuilders
Living people
Sportspeople from Prague